Dmitri Borisovich Polyanin (born 30 March 1980) is a Russian professional football coach and a former player. He works as a fitness coach with FC Pari Nizhny Novgorod.

External links
 

1980 births
Sportspeople from Perm, Russia
Living people
Russian footballers
Association football midfielders
FC Amkar Perm players
FC KAMAZ Naberezhnye Chelny players
FC Volga Nizhny Novgorod players
FC Nizhny Novgorod (2007) players
Russian Premier League players
FC Nizhny Novgorod (2015) players